Saxon Thomas Judd (November 20, 1919 – March 31, 1990) was an American football end.

Judd was born in Pottsboro, Texas, in 1919 and attended Pottsboro High School in that city. He played college football at Louisiana and Tulsa. At Tulsa, he was one of the principal receivers for passer Glenn Dobbs.

He was selected by the Chicago Cardinals in the third round (17th overall pick) of the 1944 NFL Draft but did not play in the NFL. He instead played for the Brooklyn Dodgers of the All-America Football Conference from 1946 to 1948. He appeared in 41 games, 17 as a starter, and caught 84 passes for 997 yards and seven touchdowns.

He died in 1990 in Tulsa.

References

1919 births
1990 deaths
American football ends
Brooklyn Dodgers (AAFC) players
Tulsa Golden Hurricane football players
Players of American football from Texas